Ralpancizumab (INN; development code RN317) is a monoclonal antibody designed for the treatment of dyslipidemia.

This drug was developed by Pfizer.

References 

Monoclonal antibodies